Yamini is an annual Indian classical music festival in Bangalore, organized by SPIC MACAY and hosted at Indian Institute of Management Bangalore (IIMB).

Structure 
The annual music event is being held for more than 7 years. The event is generally held in open air inside IIMB campus at the night before India's republic day and runs from dusk to dawn (6pm to 6 am). According to SPICMACAY, the primary organizers, the goal of the festival is to introduce and promote Indian classical music and arts amongst the young generation.

Performers 
In the last few years the organizers invited many Indian classical musicians and performers. Some of them are—

References

External links 
 

Culture of Bangalore
Hindustani classical music festivals
Events in Bangalore
Festivals in Karnataka